Norman Charles Hill (November 8, 1928 – January 18, 2020) was a Canadian football player who played for the Calgary Stampeders and the Winnipeg Blue Bombers. He won the Grey Cup with the Stampeders in 1948. He previously played football at and attended the University of Manitoba. He was later a neurosurgeon. He was also the first person the bring the CAT scan to Winnipeg.

References

1928 births
Canadian football people from Winnipeg
Players of Canadian football from Manitoba
Manitoba Bisons football players
Calgary Stampeders players
2020 deaths
Canadian neurosurgeons